Buffalo Trace Distillery is a distillery in Frankfort, Kentucky, owned by the Sazerac Company. It has historically been known by several names, including the George T. Stagg Distillery and the Old Fashioned Copper (O.F.C.) Distillery. Its namesake bourbon brand, Buffalo Trace Kentucky Straight Bourbon whiskey, was introduced in August 1999. The company claims the distillery is the oldest continuously-operating distillery in the United States. The company says the name "Buffalo Trace" refers to an ancient buffalo crossing on the banks of the Kentucky River in Franklin County, Kentucky. The Sazerac Company purchased the distillery in 1992.

Under its old name, George T. Stagg Distillery, the property was listed on the National Register of Historic Places on May 2, 2001, and designated a National Historic Landmark on March 11, 2013.

History

The company claims the distillery to be the oldest continuously operating distillery in the United States. Another distillery with similar historical extent is Burks' distillery, now used for production of Maker's Mark. According to its citation in the registry of National Historic Landmarks, Burks' Distillery's origins extend to 1805, and Burks' Distillery is listed in the Guinness Book of World Records as the oldest operating bourbon distillery.

Records indicate that distilling started on the site that is now the Buffalo Trace Distillery in 1775 by Hancock Lee and his brother Willis Lee who died in 1776. The first distillery was constructed in 1812 by Harrison Blanton. In 1870 the distillery was purchased by Edmund H. Taylor and given its first name, the Old Fire Copper (O.F.C.) Distillery. Taylor sold the distillery eight years later to George T. Stagg along with the Old Oscar Pepper Distillery. This second distillery was sold within the year to James Graham, in order to add more land to the O.F.C. Distillery. In 1886, Stagg installed steam heating in the storage warehouses, the first climate controlled warehouse for aging whiskey in the nation.

During Prohibition, the distillery was allowed to remain operational, in order to make whiskey for "medicinal purposes".

In 1972 Gary Gayheart became the master distiller. After his retirement in 2005, he was succeeded by Harlen Wheatley.

In 2016 Buffalo Trace Distillery announced plans to expand operations with a capital investment of $200 million.

In October 2016, during renovations to convert a building to a meeting and event space, workers discovered the foundation of the original 1873 distillery building, which burned down in 1882, along with the remains of fermenters from that same year. The original distillery foundation was left in place after the fire and an expanded distillery building was built as a replacement. The site is now open for visitors to Buffalo Trace.

In March 2022, Buffalo Trace Distillery announced the creation of six-litre OFC Vintage Bourbon Whiskeys, distilled in 1982, and their accompanying NFTs. The NFTs were sold on Blockbar, with the highest bid of $60,000. The sale was part of the distillery’s mission to raise US$2 million for charity by donating 2,022 bottles of whiskey to fundraising causes.

Production 

Spirits 

While Buffalo Trace Distillery is mainly known for its bourbon, it also produces other spirits such as rye whiskey and vodka.

"Buffalo Trace" is also a bourbon brand made by the distillery that was introduced in August 1999, two months after the distillery changed its name from the George T. Stagg Distillery.

The following spirits are produced by Buffalo Trace Distillery:
Self-produced brands
 Buffalo Trace – straight bourbon (the namesake brand for the distillery, also used for branding of an Experimental Collection, Single Oak Project, White Dog (unaged spirit with mash bills for bourbon, wheated bourbon, and rye), and Bourbon Cream (a cream liqueur)
 Col. E. H. Taylor – small batch, single-barrel, and barrel proof straight bourbon and rye
 Eagle Rare – straight bourbon and 17 year antique collection 
George T. Stagg – barrel-proof straight bourbon (with a prior name for the distillery)
 Stagg Jr. – barrel proof straight bourbon
McAfee's Benchmark – straight bourbon
O.F.C. – straight bourbon (with a prior name for the distillery)
Old Charter – straight bourbon
Old Charter Oak – straight bourbon
Old Taylor – straight bourbon
Peychaud's Bitters
Platinum 7X/Platinum 10X – vodka
Sazerac – straight rye and Sazerac antique collection
Thomas H. Handy – barrel-proof straight rye
W. L. Weller – special reserve, antique 107, and barrel proof William Larue Weller antique collection straight bourbon (with a wheated mash bill very similar or identical to that for the Van Winkle brands)
Wheatley – vodka
Brands produced in partnership with Age International (a former owner of the distillery, now part of the Japanese company Takara Holdings):
Ancient Age – straight bourbon
Blanton's single-barrel – straight bourbon
Hancock's President's Reserve – single-barrel straight bourbon
Elmer T. Lee – single-barrel straight bourbon
Rock Hill Farms – single-barrel straight bourbon
Brands produced in partnership with the Van Winkle family (under an agreement established in June 2002):
Old Rip Van Winkle – straight bourbon (wheated)
Pappy Van Winkle's Family Reserve – straight bourbon (wheated)
Van Winkle Special Reserve – straight bourbon (wheated)
Van Winkle Family Reserve – straight rye

Buffalo Trace also produces spirits for private bottlers and store brands.

See also 
 List of historic whisky distilleries

References

Bibliography

External links 

 Buffalo Trace bourbon official website
 Buffalo Trace Distillery official website
 The Sazerac Company homepage
 Eagle Rare bourbon official website
 Wheatley Vodka official website
 Old Charter Oak official website
 Buffalo Trace Oral History Project, Louie B. Nunn Center for Oral History, University of Kentucky Libraries

Bourbon whiskey
Distilleries on the National Register of Historic Places in Kentucky
National Historic Landmarks in Kentucky
National Register of Historic Places in Frankfort, Kentucky
Sazerac Company brands
Romanesque Revival architecture in Kentucky
Colonial Revival architecture in Kentucky